was a Japanese province in the area of Nara Prefecture on the island of Honshū.  It was a short-lived special division of the provinces of Japan, a part of Kinai. It was composed of only one district, . Its extent roughly coincides with that of today's Yoshino District plus Gojō city.

Yoshino was established by separating Yoshino District from Yamato Province. The unit name “” was different from the “” of normal provinces. No record remains of the reasons for their establishment.

Yoshino Province was abolished some time after the year 738 and its territory was absorbed back into Yamato Province.

References

Other websites

  Murdoch's map of provinces, 1903
  Daimyo-issued banknote from Yamato-Washu Province, 1744-1748

Former provinces of Japan
History of Nara Prefecture